James the Apostle may refer to:

 James the Great (James, the son of Zebedee) one of the twelve apostles of Jesus
 James, son of Alphaeus, one of the twelve apostles of Jesus

See also 
 James, brother of Jesus (James the Just), traditionally attributed to be the author of the Epistle of James
 James the Less, who may or may not be the same person as James the brother of Jesus or James, son of Alphaeus